Calidota divina is a moth of the family Erebidae. It was described by Schaus in 1889. It is found in Mexico.

References

Phaegopterina
Moths described in 1889